Hopea auriculata is a species of plant in the family Dipterocarpaceae. It is a tree endemic to Peninsular Malaysia.

References

auriculata
Endemic flora of Peninsular Malaysia
Trees of Peninsular Malaysia
Endangered plants
Taxonomy articles created by Polbot